K. D. K. Dharmawardena was a lyricist and broadcaster in Sri Lanka. He was born on 13 June 1944 and died on 6 November 2000. He was married to Samadara Kottage. The songs, "Kumariyaka Paa Salamba" by W.D. Amaradeva, "Kohe Sita Oba Peminiyado" by Victor Rathnayake and "Handana Pana Nala" by Sunil Edirisinghe are some of Dharmawardena's notable lyrical contributions.

References

1944 births
2000 deaths
People from British Ceylon
Sri Lankan lyricists
Sri Lankan radio personalities
Alumni of Dharmaraja College